Ahmed Ibrahim Ahmed Al-Nour (born 12 February 2000) is a Sudanese professional footballer who plays as a defender for Al-Hilal Omdurman and the Sudan national football team.

References 
 

Living people
2000 births
Sudanese footballers
Sudan international footballers
Association football defenders
Al-Hilal Club (Omdurman) players
El Hilal SC El Obeid players